The men's discus throw event at the 2002 Commonwealth Games was held on 26–27 July.

Results

References
Official results
Results at BBC

Discus
2002
2002 in women's athletics